Lee Hung-chun (born 11 May 1959) is a Taiwanese politician.

Early life
Lee Hung-chun's father Lee Teng-hui was the former head of Taishan, New Taipei. His elder brother is politician Lee Hong-yuan.

Lee Hung-chun was born in present-day New Taipei on 11 May 1959. After graduating from the Lee-Ming Institute of Technology, he earned a doctorate in structural engineering from Nihon University.

Political career
Lee won election to the Legislative Yuan in 2001 as a People First Party candidate for Taipei County's second district. He retained the office in 2004. Lee subsequently served two consecutive terms as legislator representing Taipei County's fourth district, followed by a single term on the PFP party list. As the Ninth Legislative Yuan opened, Lee received four votes to serve as the body's speaker. Though Lee ranked second on the party list during the 2020 legislative election, the People First Party lost all of its seats and was supplanted as a third party by the Taiwan People's Party.

In May 2022, Tsai Ing-wen nominated Lee for the vacant vice presidency of the Control Yuan. Lee stated that he would resign his position as PFP secretary-general, which he had held since 2019, as well as his party membership. He was formally confirmed to the Control Yuan on 24 May 2022 by a 99–2 vote of the Legislative Yuan.

References

Members of the 5th Legislative Yuan
Members of the 6th Legislative Yuan
Members of the 7th Legislative Yuan
Members of the 8th Legislative Yuan
Members of the 9th Legislative Yuan
1959 births
Living people
People First Party Members of the Legislative Yuan

Nihon University alumni
Taiwanese expatriates in Japan
New Taipei Members of the Legislative Yuan
Party List Members of the Legislative Yuan